Good Vibrations is the debut album of the Party Animals and was released in 1996.

The Party Animals made their introduction on the video for the single "I Wanna Be A Hippy" by Technohead. The clip featured three gabbers and a hippie. The producers Flamman & Abraxas discovered the four. Flamman & Abraxas remixed the single and because one of the original producers, Lee Newman, died shortly after "I Wanna Be A Hippy" became a hit, they decided to continue with the singers as a new group. Flamman & Abraxas saw a potential for opening the mainly underground scene of gabber with this group by making the sound more pop oriented and thus introducing the new genre to a mainstream audience.

The album mainly consists of cover versions of existing songs set in a fast gabber beat. The remade songs were not only pop songs, but included songs like Sarin which is based on heavy metal and Hakkefest which is based on "" from Wagner's Flying Dutchman  with 200 bpm drums set underneath. The album turned out to be very successful in The Netherlands with their first singles peaking at number one which makes them the first Dutch act to do so  The album was certified Gold  and peaked at number 3 in the Dutch album charts.

Track listing
 Party Animals - Good Vibrations (1996, CD) on Discogs

References

External links
Official Website

1996 debut albums
Party Animals (music group) albums